The 2019–20 Biathlon World Cup – Pursuit Women started on Sunday 15 December 2019 in Hochfilzen and was finished on Saturday 14 March 2020 in Kontiolahti. The defending titlist, Dorothea Wierer of Italy.

Competition format
The  pursuit race is skied over five laps. The biathlete shoots four times at any shooting lane, in the order of prone, prone, standing, standing, totalling 20 targets. For each missed target a biathlete has to run a  penalty loop. Competitors' starts are staggered, according to the result of the previous sprint race.

2018–19 Top 3 standings

Medal winners

Standings

References

Pursuit Women